The alar fascia is a layer of fascia, sometimes described as part of the prevertebral fascia, and sometimes as in front of it.

Anatomy 
Cranially, it reaches the skull, and caudally, it reaches the second thoracic vertebra.

In 2015, the anatomy of the alar fascia was revisited using dissection in conjunction with E12 plastination. The authors revealed that the alar fascia originated as a well defined midline structure at the level of C1 and does not reach the base of the skull. It is suggested that the area between C1 and the base of the skull is a potential entry into the danger space.

Anatomical relations 
The alar fascia represents the posterior boundary of the retropharyngeal space.

See also
 Retrovisceral space

References

Fascial spaces of the head and neck